Paul Marcon (born 10 July 1995) is a French professional rugby league footballer who plays as a winger for Toulouse Olympique in the Betfred Championship and France at international level.

Background
He is a relative of former French international Serge Marcon.

Domestic career
He then began his playing career at Villeneuve before joining Toulouse as a youngster.

Marcon has spent time playing on loan for the Toulouse Broncos.

Toulouse Olympique
In July 2020, Toulouse announced that Marcon had signed a contract extension until the end of the 2022 season.

International career
Marcon has played for France at youth team level.

He was selected in France 9s squad for the 2019 Rugby League World Cup 9s.

References

External links
Toulouse Olympique profile
France profile
French profile
France RL profile

1995 births
Living people
France national rugby league team players
French rugby league players
Rugby league wingers
Toulouse Olympique Broncos players
Toulouse Olympique players
Villeneuve Leopards players